Kurten is a town located along U.S. Highway 190 in Brazos County, Texas, United States. As of the 2010 census, it had a population of 398. It was incorporated in 2000 and is part of the Bryan–College Station metropolitan area.

Geography
Kurten is located in northern Brazos County along U.S. Route 190.

Demographics

Education
The town is served by Bryan Independent School District (BISD).

Houston Elementary School is the main zoned elementary school, while bilingual students zoned to Houston attend Henderson Elementary School. All students are zoned to: Rayburn Intermediate School, Davila Middle School, and Rudder High School.

History
In April 1906, the Kurten City Council passed a law that prohibited the sale and distribution of guinea fowl. Originally from Africa, these imported birds became very popular in the Central Texas region. However, their popularity declined as the guinea population faced a rapid increase in number. Consequently, the birds quickly became a problem for the local townspeople. They crowded the streets and became aggressive when confronted. In early April 1906, 11 different guinea fowl attacks had been reported, and the Kurten City Council passed the Fowl Redistribution Act.

Each year, Kurten holds its annual fireworks show on Independence Day at the Kurten Community Center. For 13 years, the fireworks show has drawn in large crowds from all over Central Texas.

References

External links
 
 City of Kurten official website

Towns in Texas
Towns in Brazos County, Texas
Bryan–College Station